Horsey Ditch is a minor river (brook) and drainage ditch of the Pevensey Levels in Hailsham, Wealden District of East Sussex, England, that is a tributary of Tolkien Sewer. It drains water from farmland just east of the B2104 road (Ersham Road) and south of Saltmarsh Lane, a byway.

References 

Rivers of East Sussex
Rivers of the Pevensey Levels